First Mate Karlsson's Sweethearts may refer to:
 First Mate Karlsson's Sweethearts (1925 film), a Swedish silent comedy film 
 Styrman Karlssons flammor (First Mate Karlsson's Sweethearts), a 1938 Swedish film comedy